The Stolen Treaty (1913 film), 1913 silent film directed by Anthony O'Sullivan
The Stolen Treaty (1917 film), 1917 silent film directed by Paul Scardon